The 1894 Albion football team was an American football team that represented Albion College in the Michigan Intercollegiate Athletic Association (MIAA) during the 1894 college football season.

Schedule

 The contest against Battle Creek High School was considered a practice game, and so is not reflected on the final record.

Second team schedule
Albion's second team was organized in early October. They were managed by W. F. Kendrick and captained by Frank Mulholland.

References

Albion
Albion Britons football seasons
Albion football